Army Staff may refer to:

 Army Staff (Denmark)
 Army Staff (Sweden)
 Army Staff (Germany)
 Army Staff (Italy)
 Army Staff (United States)

See also
Chief of Army Staff (disambiguation)